Jade Jones (born 12 February 1979) is a British R&B singer turned chef. He is best known for being the lead singer of the band Damage. He was born to a Jamaican father and a British mother.

After leaving Damage, Jones joined CherryBlackStone, which appeared on Channel 4's Bo in the USA. In 2006, he participated in and went on to win the Channel 4 reality show The Games.

Jones left CherryBlackStone in 2008 following his son's birth and became a full-time trainee chef.

In 2014, Jones appeared with three of the original Damage members—Rahsaan J Bromfield, Andrez Harriott and Noel Simpson—in the second series of The Big Reunion on ITV2.

Personal life
Since 1998, he has been in an on/off relationship with Spice Girls singer Emma Bunton. The couple became engaged on 21 January 2011. The couple have two children, born on 10 August 2007, and born on 6 May 2011. Jones and Bunton married on 13 July 2021.

References

Living people
Singers from London
20th-century Black British male singers
British contemporary R&B singers
People from Finchley
Reality show winners
English chefs
Emma Bunton
English people of Jamaican descent
1979 births